Blondeel may refer to:

 Lancelot Blondeel (1498-1561), painter
 Eddy Blondeel, a Belgian SAS officer